Charles H. Warren may refer to:

Charles Howard Warren (1856-1935), US railroad and insurance executive
Charles Hyde Warren (1876—1950), US geologist.
Charles H. Warren, President of the Massachusetts Senate in 1853